The André-Michaux Ecological Reserve, or Réserve écologique André-Michaux, is an ecological reserve in Quebec, Canada. It protects a variety of vegetation types typically of the Canadian Shield.

Location

It is south of Île du Plomb, west of Denholm and east of Martindale.
It covers  beside the Gatineau River.
It is named in honour of the botanist and horticulturist André Michaux (1746-1803) who worked and published in Quebec and Europe.

Terrain

Rocks are paragneiss, amphibolites and granites.
Surface deposits are mainly tills.
Soils include Dystric Brunisols, Humo-Ferric podzols and lithosols on the rocky ridges.

Ecology

The reserve protects representative ecosystems of the Lower Gatineau ecological region, including stands of maple-basswood and maple-yellow birch.
Depending its location on the slopes the vegetation may be xeric, swampy, or a range of intermediate groups.
Xeric vegetation on the upper slopes with convex forms includes white pine and red pine, with red oak in the driest places, and stunted red oak in extremely arid places.
On poorly drained flat land there is fir / white spruce, sphagnum and black ash / grey alder.
There are grasses and swamp shrubs along the edges of lakes.
In the intermediate areas of moderate drainage there are maple / basswood groves, and some drier varieties such as red oak or bur oak, maple / yellow birch, and hemlock. 
Galearis spectabilis may also be found.
Fauna include white-tailed deer, beaver, heron, ruffed grouse and black duck.

Notes

Sources

Nature reserves in Outaouais
Protected areas established in 1993
1993 establishments in Quebec